Ancylolomia albicostalis is a moth in the family Crambidae. It was described by George Hampson in 1919. It is found in Zimbabwe.

References

Endemic fauna of Zimbabwe
Ancylolomia
Moths described in 1919
Moths of Africa